Ndabazinhle Mdhlongwa (born May 30, 1973) is a retired Zimbabwean triple jumper. He was the African record holder with 17.34 metres from 1998 to 2007.

He won bronze medals at the 1992 World Junior Championships and the 1995 All-Africa Games as well as a silver medal at the 1998 African Championships. Mdhlongwa competed at the Olympic Games in 1992 (both long jump and triple jump) and 1996, the World Championships in 1995 and 1997 as well as the 1997 IAAF World Indoor Championships without reaching the final round.

Achievements

References

External links

1973 births
Living people
Zimbabwean long jumpers
Zimbabwean triple jumpers
Athletes (track and field) at the 1994 Commonwealth Games
Athletes (track and field) at the 1998 Commonwealth Games
Athletes (track and field) at the 1992 Summer Olympics
Athletes (track and field) at the 1996 Summer Olympics
Olympic athletes of Zimbabwe
Commonwealth Games competitors for Zimbabwe
Zimbabwean male athletes
African Games bronze medalists for Zimbabwe
African Games medalists in athletics (track and field)
World Athletics Championships athletes for Zimbabwe
Athletes (track and field) at the 1995 All-Africa Games
Athletes (track and field) at the 1999 All-Africa Games